Gigi Savoia (born 30 November 1954), also known as Luigi Savoia, is an Italian actor.

Career
Savoia was born in Naples. He debuted in theatre in 1980 with Pescatori, written by Raffaele Viviani and directed by Mariano Rigillo. Currently he recites in Eduardo De Filippo's comedy Le voci di dentro directed by Francesco Rosi.

Filmography

Film
1986 - Terno Secco - Directed by Giancarlo Giannini
1989 - Scugnizzi - Directed by Nanni Loy
1993 - Malesh - Directed by Angelo Cannavacciuolo
1993 - Pacco, doppio pacco e contropaccotto - Directed by Nanni Loy
1999 - Prima del tramonto - Directed by Stefano Incerti
2002 - Solino - Directed by Fatih Akin
2003 - Il mare, non c'è paragone - Directed by Eduardo Tartaglia
2019 - Rosa Pietra e Stella - Directed by Marcello Sannino

Theatre
1980 - Pescatori - Directed by Mariano Rigillo
1981 - L’arbitro - Directed by Mariano Rigillo
1981 - Ditegli sempre di sì - Directed by Eduardo De Filippo
1982 - Chi è cchiu' felice 'e me! - Directed by Eduardo De Filippo
1983 - Tre cazune fortunate - Directed by Eduardo De Filippo
1983 - Il turco napoletano - Directed by Eduardo De Filippo
1984 - La bisbetica - Directed by Giancarlo Sepe
1985 - O’ Scarfalietto - Directed by Armando Pugliese
1985 - Don Giovanni - Directed by Armando Pugliese
1986 - Non ti pago - Directed by Luca De Filippo
1988 - Svenimenti - Directed by Antonio Calende
1989 - Flaiano-Silone-D’Annunzio - Directed by Giorgio Albertazzi
1990 - Memorie di Adriano - Directed by Maurizio Scaparro
1991 - Aida - Directed by Armando Pugliese
1992 - Questi fantasmi! - Directed by Luca De Filippo
1994 - Casa di frontiera - Directed by Gigi Proietti
1995 - Attori comici affittasi – Directed by Gigi Savoia
1995 - Na mugliera zitella – Directed by Gigi Savoia
1995 - Non mangiare il pollo con le dita – Directed by Gigi Savoia
1995 - Il monaco nel letto – Directed by Gigi Savoia
1996 - Morte di carnevale – Directed by Gigi Savoia
1996 - Pescatori – Directed by Gigi Savoia
1996 - Vico – Directed by Gigi Savoia
1997 - Toledo di notte – Directed by Gigi Savoia
1997 - Assunta Spina – Directed by Gigi Savoia
1997 - Napoli 1900 – Directed by Gigi Savoia
1997 - Don Giovanni – Directed by Franco Però
1997 - Il matrimonio di Figaro – Directed by Mico Galdieri
1998 - L’ultimo scugnizzo – Directed by Gigi Savoia
1999 - La Figliata – Directed by Gigi Savoia
1999 - Re Minore – Directed by Gigi Savoia
2000 - I casi sono due – Directed by Gigi Savoia
2003 - Vuoto di scena – Directed by Gigi Savoia
2003 - A’ Nanassa – Directed by Gigi Savoia
2003 - Ci sta un Francese, un Inglese e un Napoletano – Directed by Edoardo Tartaglia
2004 - Ridi Pagliaccio Ridi – Directed by Gigi Savoia
2004 - Amare Donne all’Infinito – Gigi Savoia
2005 - Comico Napoletano – Directed by Gigi Savoia
2005 - I veri fantasmi – Directed by Peppe Miale
2006 - L’ultimo scugnizzo – Directed by Gigi Savoia
2006 - L’ultimo giorno di un condannato a morte
2003/2006 - Napoli milionaria! – Directed by Francesco Rosi
2006/2008 - Le voci di dentro – Directed by Francesco Rosi
2022 - Il Muro di Napoli - Directed by Gigi Savoia

Television
1990 - Il Riscatto - Directed by Leon Ichaso
2001 - La Squadra
2001 - Incantesimo
2003 - Casafamiglia
2004 - Un posto al sole
2016 - La Famiglia - Television Hollanda

References

The New York Times Movies
https://web.archive.org/web/20110607014800/http://www.timeout.com/film/chicago/people/343561/gigi-savoia.html
http://www.fandango.com/gigisavoia/filmography/p271640
https://archive.today/20130125123608/http://www.hollywood.com/celebrity/Gigi_Savoia/1516271
http://www.allmovie.com/cg/avg.dll?p=avg&sql=2:271640~T2
http://www.defilippo.it/stag_06_07/loca_06_07.htm
http://skyitalia.it/showactor.do;jsessionid=3DFF56A7BFE8351D24B91B73619674D2?id=12078

External links

1954 births
Living people
20th-century Italian male actors
21st-century Italian male actors
Italian male film actors
Italian male stage actors
Italian male television actors
Male actors from Naples